Karen Neumann  (born 15 September 1971; née Stechmann) is a German badminton player. She competed at the 1996 and 2000 Summer Olympics. In the national event, Neumann who played for the FC Langenfeld had won eight titles at the National Championships. Neumann was the bronze medallists at the 1996 European Championships in the mixed doubles event, and at the 1989 European Junior Championships in the girls' doubles event.

Achievements

European Championships 
Mixed doubles

IBF World Grand Prix
The World Badminton Grand Prix sanctioned by International Badminton Federation (IBF) since 1983.

Mixed doubles

IBF International
Women's doubles

Mixed doubles

References

External links
 
 

1971 births
Living people
People from Stade
Sportspeople from Lower Saxony
German female badminton players
Olympic badminton players of Germany
Badminton players at the 2000 Summer Olympics
Badminton players at the 1996 Summer Olympics